New York Drives is a free program at Brooklyn Workforce Innovations (BWI). It provides unemployed and low-income New Yorkers with free driver's education courses and job readiness training, leading to a New York State driver's license and placement in sector-based career training programs within TV/film production, cable installation, and woodworking.

New York Drives provides three weeks of part-time professional development skills training, followed by three to four weeks of part-time driving lessons. After participants successfully pass the road test, graduates can apply to one of BWI's sector-based training programs leading to skilled employment. All programs include industry-specific skills training by experienced professionals, weekly information sessions, and 2 years of job placement assistance. Trainees receive ongoing social supports through Single Stop.

Prospective students must meet the minimum eligibility requirements to be accepted into the New York Drives program:

•	At least 21 years old (18+ years old for Made in NY)

•	NYC resident and eligible to work in the US

•     	Unemployed or underemployed

•	Full-time availability (Monday- Friday 9 am to 5 pm)

•	Interest in and qualify for one of BWI's sector training programs (Made in NY, Brooklyn Networks or Brooklyn Woods)

•	Must not have had a driver's license previously.

•	Ready to work once completing New York Drives and a training program.

External links
Brooklyn Workforce Innovations website
Facebook page

Driver's education
Education in New York (state)